Megacraspedus macrocanellus is a moth of the family Gelechiidae. It was described by Daniel Lucas in 1932. It is found in Morocco.

References

Moths described in 1932
Megacraspedus